Chloroclystis onusta is a moth in the family Geometridae. It is found in the Afrotropical realm.

References

External links

Moths described in 1994
onusta